Domenico Rainaldi was an Italian painter of the Baroque period, active in Rome in  1665.

References

17th-century Italian painters
Italian male painters
Italian Baroque painters
Year of death unknown
Year of birth unknown